Novokulikovsky is a rural locality (a settlement) in Glubokovsky Selsoviet, Zavyalovsky District, Altai Krai, Russia. The population was 116 as of 2013. There are 4 streets.

Geography 
Novokulikovsky is located 36 km northwest of Zavyalovo (the district's administrative centre) by road. Glubokoye is the nearest rural locality.

References 

Rural localities in Zavyalovsky District, Altai Krai